Tuberville may refer to:

Tommy Tuberville (born 1954), American football coach and Senator
Tuberville v Savage (1669), an English legal decision on assault

See also

Turberville, a surname